Onthophagus turbatus, is a species of dung beetle found in India, and Sri Lanka.

Description
This oval, compact and less convex species has an average length of about 7 to 8 mm. Body bronze colored with a slight metallic green shine on dorsum. There is an undefined orange patch at the base of each elytron near the shoulder. Antennae and mouthparts are yellowish. Dorsum fairly closely clothed with minute greyish setae. Head rather broad, with rugose clypeus. Forehead sparingly punctured. Pronotum finely and closely punctured. Elytra finely striate, with flat intervals. Pygidium moderately punctured. Males are found in two forms as: long-horned phase and short-horned phase. In long-horned phase, there is a nearly erect horn arising between the eyes which is curving gently backward. Pronotum transversely hollowed. In short-horned phase, there is a short, transverse, erect, truncate horn between the eyes. Female has a strong transverse carina between the eyes.

References 

Scarabaeinae
Insects of India
Beetles of Sri Lanka
Beetles described in 1858